The gladius (plural: gladii), or pen, is a hard internal bodypart found in many cephalopods of the superorder Decapodiformes (particularly squids) and in a single extant member of the Octopodiformes, the vampire squid (Vampyroteuthis infernalis). It is so named for its superficial resemblance to the Roman short sword of the same name, and is a vestige of the ancestral mollusc shell, which was external. The gladius is located dorsally within the mantle and usually extends for its entire length. Composed primarily of chitin, it lies within the shell sac, which is responsible for its secretion.

Gladii are known from a number of extinct cephalopod groups, including teudopseids (e.g. Actinosepia, Glyphiteuthis, Muensterella, Palaeololigo, Teudopsinia, Teudopsis, and Trachyteuthis), loligosepiids (e.g. Geopeltis, Jeletzkyteuthis, and Loligosepia), and prototeuthids (e.g. Dorateuthis, Paraplesioteuthis, and Plesioteuthis).

Variability
Gladii are shaped in many distinctive ways and vary considerably between species, though are often like a feather or leaf. Some examples are shown below.

See also

Cuttlebone
Belemnoidea
Argonaut (animal)
Nautilus
Mollusc shell

References

Further reading
  513 pp.
  390 pp.
 

Cephalopod zootomy
Skeletal system